This is the list of Malay College Kuala Kangsar Alumni.

Royalty
 Tuanku Abdul Rahman -The first Yang di-Pertuan Agong and the second Yang di-Pertuan Besar of Negeri Sembilan
 Sultan Hisamuddin Alam Shah - The second Yang di-Pertuan Agong & the fifth Sultan of Selangor
 Sultan Ismail Nasiruddin Shah - The fourth Yang di-Pertuan Agong & the fifteenth Sultan of Terengganu, the father of Modern Malaysian Photography 
 Sultan Ahmad Shah - The seventh Yang di-Pertuan Agong & the thirty-fourth Sultan of Pahang
 Sultan Azlan Shah - The ninth Yang di-Pertuan Agong & 34th Sultan of Perak, the fifth Lord President of the Supreme Court.
 Tuanku Jaafar - The tenth Yang di-Pertuan Agong & The tenth Yang di-Pertuan Besar of Negeri Sembilan
 Sultan Salahuddin Abdul Aziz Shah - The eleventh Yang di-Pertuan Agong & the eighth Sultan of Selangor
 Sultan Ismail - The twenty-third Sultan of Johor
 Sultan Idris Iskandar Shah- 33rd Sultan of Perak
 Sultan Omar Ali Saifuddien III, The twenty-eight Sultan of Brunei

Titular heads
 Abdul Aziz Abdul Majid - The third Yang di-Pertua Negeri of Melaka
 Mohd Khalil Yaakob - The thirteenth Menteri Besar of Pahang & current Yang di-Pertua of Negeri of Melaka
 Raja Uda Raja Muhammad - The first Yang di-Pertua Negeri of  Penang
 Dato' Muhammad Abdullah - Undang Luak Johol Ke-15 Negeri Sembilan

Politics
 Onn Jaafar - KBE; The seventh Menteri Besar of Johor and the founder of United Malays National Organisation (UMNO), father of Malay nationalism
 Abdul Razak Hussein - The second Prime Minister of Malaysia
 Anwar Ibrahim - the  10th Prime Minister of Malaysia, advisor of People's Justice Party and Leader of the Loyal Opposition (Malaysia)
 Abdul Wahab Abdul Aziz - First Menteri Besar of Perak
 Othman Talib - First Chief Minister of Malacca
 Raja Kamaruddin Idris - The fifth Menteri Besar of Terengganu
 Sanusi Junid - The seventh Menteri Besar of Kedah & the fourth president of International Islamic University Malaysia
 Tengku Razaleigh Hamzah - Former Minister of Finance, founding chairman of Petronas, Longest serving member of parliament of Malaysia
 Nik Ahmad Kamil Nik Mahmud - 6th Menteri Besar of Kelantan, 4th Speaker of the Dewan Rakyat
 Ramli Ngah Talib - 8th Menteri Besar of Perak, 7th Speaker of the Dewan Rakyat
 Abu Hassan Omar - 12th Menteri Besar of Selangor
 Saifuddin Abdullah - Minister of Foreign Affairs.
 Hishammuddin Hussein - Former Minister of Defense
 Mohamed Nazri Abdul Aziz - Former Minister of Tourism and Culture Malaysia
 Shahrir Abdul Samad - Former Minister of Domestic Trade and consumer care.
 Latt Shariman Abdullah - Barisan Nasional, UMNO Kuala Kedah Division Chief, Special Function Officer to Prime Minister
 Fauzi Abdul Rahman - Chairman of Pahang's Parti Keadilan Rakyat, former Deputy Minister in the Prime Minister's Department
 Mohd Yahya Mat Sahri - Member of the central leadership of (MPP) Parti Keadilan Rakyat
 Rafizi Ramli - Vice-president and secretary-general, People's Justice Party (PKR)
 Nik Nazmi Nik Ahmad - Member of Parliament for Setiawangsa, Parti Keadilan Rakyat 
 Akmal Nasir - Member of Parliament for Johor Bahru, Parti Keadilan Rakyat 
 Mohd Hatta Ramli - Member of Parliament for Lumut
 Kamarudin Jaffar - Member of Parliament for Bandar Tun Razak
 Khalid Kassim - ADUN Bukit Baru
 Mohd Khalid Zahir - Speaker of DUN Perak, former ADUN Kemunting & Perak State Exco
 Wan Abdul Hakim Wan Mokhtar - Former ADUN of Ayer Putih
 Musa Mohamad - Former Minister of Home Affairs
 Mohd Effendi Norwawi - Former Minister in the Prime Minister's Department
 Mohd Ramli Md. Kari - Former Adun of Senggarang
 Iskandar Abdul Samad - Former Adun of Chempaka and EXCO the state of Selangor

Economy
 Yahaya Ahmad - Founder of DRB-HICOM
 Hassan Merican - Former CEO of Petronas
 Saleh Sulong - Former DRB-HICOM Chairman
 Azman Mokhtar - CEO of Khazanah Nasional Berhad
 Wan Zulkiflee Wan Ariffin - CEO of Petronas
 Tengku Zafrul Aziz - Minister of Finance Malaysia
 Zamzamzairani Mohd Isa - Chairman of UEM Sunrise & former CEO of Telekom Malaysia Berhad
 Syahrunizam Samsudin - CEO of Touch N Go
 Megat Zaharuddin Megat Mohd Nor - Chairman of Maybank
 Ahmad Johari Abdul Razak - Chairman of the Board of Courts Malaysia. Director of Deutsche Bank (Malaysia). Former Director of Laura Ashley plc.

Architecture
 Baharuddin Kassim - Architect of National Mosque of Malaysia, PAM Gold Medal Winner
 Ikmal Hisham Albakri - Renowned Architect, PAM Past President
 Sarly Adre Sarkum - Award Winning Architect, MGBC President, PAM Council Member

Education
 Halim Saad - founder of  Kolej Yayasan Saad
 Dzulkifli Abdul Razak - Rector of International Islamic University Malaysia

Law
 Azmi Kamaruddin - former Malaysian Federal Court Judge
 Abdull Hamid Embong - former Malaysian Federal Court Judge

Armed Forces
 Raja Aman Shah Raja Harun Al-Rashid - Pioneer malay commanders
 Raja Lope Nor Rashid Raja Abdul Rahman - Royal Malay Regiment, Pioneer malay commanders
 Yazid Ahmad - Royal Malay Regiment,  Pioneer malay commanders
 Mohammed Hanif Omar - former Inspector-General of Police
 Yeop Mahidin Mohamed Shariff - MBE; Founder, First Director, & First Commander of Rejimen Askar Wataniah - dubbed as "Father of Wataniah"
 Abdul Rahman Mohd Tahir - the Pioneer Director & Provost Marshall of Royal Military Police Corps - dubbed as "Rahman Rimau"

The arts
 Pak Sako or Ishak Haji Muhammad - author and nationalist
 Khairil Ridzwan Annuar a.k.a. Loque - founding member of the legendary band Butterfingers, and now with Monoloque
Fakharuddin Bahar a.ka. Kadax - bassist, Butterfingers
 Redza Minhat - Actor, model , Chief Rep. London Office Bank Negara Malaysia (BNM) and script writer
 Hani Mohsin - Actor, model

Others
 Razali Ismail - 51st President of the United Nations General Assembly, chairman of United Nations Security Council. 
 Abdullah Ahmad - Special Representative of Malaysia to United Nations
 Tunku Adnan Tunku Besar Burhanuddin - Malaysian Chef de Mission for the Commonwealth Games in 1974, the Asian Games (also in the same year) and Olympic Games in Los Angeles 1984.
 Halim Saad - New Straits Times's chief executive officer
 Mohd Fadzillah Kamsah - famous motivational expert
 Salman Ahmad - High Commissioner of Malaysia to Australia
 Kamil Othman - Director of FINAS
 Mohamed Mokhtar Mohd Sufyan - Legislation director of Suruhanjaya Syarikat Malaysia (SSM)
 Raja Petra Kamarudin - Controversial Malaysian editor
 Akmal Nasir - director of Malaysia’s National Oversight and Whistleblowers (NOW) Centre
 Hussein Mohd Taib - Pahang's Aristocrat.

References
Notes

Bibliography
 Paridah Abd. Samad (2009). Datuk Seri Najib: A Long Political Journey. From The Golden Boy of Malaysian Politics to Malaysia's Sixth Prime Minister. Partisan Publication & Distribution. 

Lists of people by school affiliation
Lists of Malaysian people
People by educational institution in Malaysia